PT symmetry was initially studied as a specific system in non-Hermitian quantum mechanics, where Hamiltonians are not Hermitian. In 1998, physicist Carl Bender and former graduate student Stefan Boettcher published in Physical Review Letters a paper in quantum mechanics, "Real Spectra in non-Hermitian Hamiltonians Having PT Symmetry." In this paper, the authors found non-Hermitian Hamiltonians endowed with an unbroken PT symmetry (invariance with respect to the simultaneous action of the parity-inversion and time reversal symmetry operators) also may possess a real spectrum. Under a correctly-defined inner product, a PT-symmetric Hamiltonian's eigenfunctions have positive norms and exhibit unitary time evolution, requirements for quantum theories. Bender won the 2017 Dannie Heineman Prize for Mathematical Physics for his work.  

A closely related concept is that of pseudo-Hermitian operators, which were considered by physicists Dirac, Pauli, and Lee and Wick. Pseudo-Hermitian operators were discovered (or rediscovered) almost simultaneously by mathematicians Krein et al.     as G-Hamiltonian in the study of linear dynamical systems. The equivalence between pseudo-Hermiticity and G-Hamiltonian is easy to establish.     

In 2002, Ali Mostafazadeh showed that every non-Hermitian Hamiltonian with a real spectrum is pseudo-Hermitian. He found that PT-symmetric non-Hermitian Hamiltonians that are diagonalizable belong to the class of pseudo-Hermitian Hamiltonians.

 
However, this result is not useful because essentially all interesting physics happens at the exception points where the systems are  not diagonalizable. In 2020, it was proven that in finite dimensions PT-symmetry entails pseudo-Hermiticity regardless of diagonalizability, which indicates that the mechanism of PT-symmetry breaking at exception points, where the Hamiltionian is usually not diagonalizable, is the Krein collision between two eigenmodes with opposite signs of actions. 

In 2005, PT symmetry was introduced to the field of optics by the research group of Gonzalo Muga by noting that PT symmetry corresponds to the presence of balanced gain and loss. In 2007, the physicist Demetrios Christodoulides and his collaborators further studied the implications of PT symmetry in optics. The coming years saw the first experimental demonstrations of PT symmetry in passive and active systems. PT symmetry has also been applied to classical mechanics, metamaterials, electric circuits, and nuclear magnetic resonance. 
In 2017, a non-Hermitian PT-symmetric Hamiltonian was proposed by Dorje Brody, and Markus Müller that "formally satisfies the conditions of the Hilbert–Pólya conjecture."

References

Quantum optics